Dominique Bataille (born 29 October 1963) is a retired French freestyle swimmer. He competed in two events at the 1984 Summer Olympics.

References

External links
 

1963 births
Living people
French male freestyle swimmers
Olympic swimmers of France
Swimmers at the 1984 Summer Olympics
Place of birth missing (living people)